Glossodrilus is a genus of South American earthworm.

Haplotaxida